Bruno Castanheira may refer to:
 Bruno Suzuki, Brazilian footballer also known as Bruno Castanheira
 Bruno Castanheira (cyclist), Portuguese cyclist